Eudonia leucogramma is a moth in the family Crambidae. This species was first described by Edward Meyrick in 1884. It is endemic to New Zealand.

The wingspan is about 21 mm. The forewings are blackish-fuscous, with some white scales. The first line is white, as is the second line. The hindwings of the males are light grey with a darker hindmargin. Females have dark fuscous-grey hindwings. Adults have been recorded on wing in January.

References

Moths described in 1884
Eudonia
Taxa named by Edward Meyrick
Moths of New Zealand
Endemic fauna of New Zealand
Endemic moths of New Zealand